The Nokia XL is a smartphone announced as part of the Nokia X family in February 2014, running on the Nokia X platform. It is currently sold and maintained by Microsoft Mobile.

Specification sheet

Background 

The Nokia XL was announced in a surprising manner at the 2014 edition of Mobile World Congress on 24 February 2014 which was held in Barcelona, Spain.

Reports suggested only a 4-inch touchscreen Android running Nokia X will be unveiled but Nokia also announced the 'Nokia X family' which was made up of Nokia X, Nokia X+ and Nokia XL.

Nokia XL was much of a hardware upgrade from the other members of the maiden Nokia X family. It came with a 5-inch touchscreen instead of the 4-inch ones on the others. It featured a bigger camera (5 MP sensor) and also a LED flash and 2 MP front-facing camera—the last two are absent on the Nokia X and Nokia X+ models.

The phone was known in the development stages as "Asha Monster".

Nokia XL 4G
An LTE version was released in China in July 2014.

References

External links 
 
 Nokia X range of Android Devices

XL
Mobile phones introduced in 2014
Discontinued smartphones
Mobile phones with user-replaceable battery